Vani Rani is a 1974 Indian Tamil-language film, directed initially by Tapi Chanakya and finished by C. V. Rajendran. Produced by Nagi Reddi and Chakrapani. The film stars Sivaji Ganesan, Vanisri and R. Muthuraman. It is a remake of the Hindi film Seeta Aur Geeta. The film was released on 14 April 1974.

Plot 

Vani, an orphan, is ill-treated by her aunt who seeks to usurp her wealth. When she runs away from home, her lookalike, Rani, enters the house and she teaches Vani's aunt a lesson.

Cast 

Sivaji Ganesan as Rangan
Vanisri as Vani and Rani
R. Muthuraman as Dr. Ravi
K. A. Thangavelu as Sabapathi
T. K. Bhagavathi as Ravi's father
K. D. Santhanam as Ramanathan
Srikanth as Gopal
Senthamarai as Ramanathan's property family lawyer
Nagesh in Guest appearance
G. Varalakshmi as Vani's grandmother
C. K. Saraswathi as Nagaveni (Nagu)
Ganthimathi as Rani Guardian Mother
Y. Vijaya as Sheela

Production 
Vani Rani is a remake of the Hindi film Seeta Aur Geeta. The film was initially directed by Tapi Chanakya; due to his death partway through the shoot, he was replaced by C. V. Rajendran. Both Chanakya and Rajendran received director's credit.

Soundtrack 
The music was composed by K. V. Mahadevan, with lyrics by Kannadasan.

Reception 
Kanthan of Kalki appreciated Aaroor Dass' dialogues and Sundarababu's cinematography.

References

External links 

1970s Tamil-language films
1974 films
Films directed by C. V. Rajendran
Films directed by Tapi Chanakya
Films scored by K. V. Mahadevan
Tamil remakes of Hindi films
Twins in Indian films